Milton Lambert "Irish" Levy (December 22, 1903 – April 26, 1958) was an American football guard for the Tulane Green Wave of Tulane University. He was twice selected All-Southern, and once selected second-team All-American by The New York Times. Levy was selected for the New York Sun's All-Time Tulane team and inducted into the Tulane Hall Of Fame ("the T Club") in 1986.

Early years
Milton Lambert Levy was born on December 22, 1903, in New Orleans, Louisiana, to Lazare Levy and Isabelle G. Cain.

Tulane University
Levy was a prominent guard for the Tulane Green Wave football team of Tulane University, and is considered one of the greatest ever to play for the school.

1925
The 1925 team were undefeated and claimed a Southern Conference championship. Levy was never taken out of a game for an injury during his playing career. He was the only lineman lost for the 1926 season, but assisted his alma mater as a coach that year.

References

1903 births
1958 deaths
American football guards
Tulane Green Wave football coaches
Tulane Green Wave football players
All-Southern college football players
Sportspeople from New Orleans
Players of American football from New Orleans
Jewish American sportspeople
20th-century American Jews